Josef Artur "Sepp" Göbl (11 June 1905 – September 7, 1971) was an Austrian ice hockey player who competed for the Austrian national team at the 1928 Winter Olympics in Saint-Moritz and the 1936 Winter Olympics in Garmisch-Partenkirchen.

He became the manager of an ice rink in The Hague, Netherlands, in 1937.

Playing career
Domestically, Göbl played for Wiener EV and EK Engelmann Wien in the Austrian Hockey Championship.

He made 22 appearances for the Austrian national team at the World Championships between 1930 and 1935. Göbl also represented his country at the Olympics in 1928 and 1936.

References

1905 births
1971 deaths
Austrian ice hockey centres
Ice hockey players at the 1928 Winter Olympics
Ice hockey players at the 1936 Winter Olympics
Olympic ice hockey players of Austria
Ice hockey people from Vienna